This is a list of Japanese professional wrestler Mitsuharu Misawa's championships and accomplishments. Misawa (1962-2009) debuted for All Japan Pro Wrestling (AJPW) in 1981, and began work as the second incarnation of the Tiger Mask gimmick in 1984. He achieved some success as the character, but when he unmasked mid-match in May 1990, Misawa was pushed to the top of the company, and became one of AJPW's most decorated wrestlers of the 1990s. When he led a mass exodus to start his promotion Pro Wrestling Noah, he continued to have great success until his death in an in-ring accident. Misawa also received significant critical acclaim from domestic and international publications throughout his career.

By promotion

All Japan Pro Wrestling
 All Asia Tag Team Championship (2 times) – with Kenta Kobashi (1) and Yoshinari Ogawa (1)
 Triple Crown Heavyweight Championship (5 times)
 World Tag Team Championship (6 times) – with Toshiaki Kawada (2), Kenta Kobashi (2), Jun Akiyama (1) and Yoshinari Ogawa (1)
 NWA International Junior Heavyweight Championship (1 time)
 PWF World Tag Team Championship (1 time) – with Jumbo Tsuruta
 Champion Carnival (1995, 1998)
 World's Strongest Tag Determination League (1992, 1993, 1994, 1995) – with Toshiaki Kawada (1992), Kenta Kobashi (1993–1995)

Pro Wrestling Noah 
 GHC Heavyweight Championship (3 times)
 GHC Tag Team Championship (2 times) – with Yoshinari Ogawa
 Global Tag League (2009) – with Go Shiozaki

Awards

Nikkan Sports
Match of the Year (2007) 
Wrestler of the Year (2007, 2009)

Pro Wrestling Illustrated
 Ranked No. 2 of the top 500 singles wrestlers in the PWI 500 in 1997
 Ranked No. 6 of the top 500 singles wrestlers of the "PWI Years" in 2003
 Ranked as Tiger Mask No. 37 of the top 500 singles wrestlers of the "PWI Years" in 2003
 Ranked No. 6 and No. 11 of the top 100 tag teams of the "PWI Years" with Kenta Kobashi and Toshiaki Kawada, respectively, in 2003

Tokyo Sports
 Fighting Spirit Award (1985, 1990)
 Lifetime Achievement Award (2009)
 Match of the Year Award (1995) 
 Match of the Year Award (1997) 
 Match of the Year Award (1998) 
 Match of the Year Award (2003) 
 Match of the Year Award (2007) 
 Outstanding Performance Award (1997)
 Rookie of the Year (1982)
 Special Grand Prize (1992)
 Tag Team of the Year (1991) with Toshiaki Kawada
 Tag Team of the Year (1993, 1994) 
 Wrestler of the Year (2007)

Wrestling Observer Newsletter
 Best Flying Wrestler (1985, 1986)
 Best Wrestling Maneuver (1985) 
 Feud of the Year (1990, 1991) 
 Match of the Year (1985) 
 Match of the Year (1996) 
 Match of the Year (1998) 
 Match of the Year (1999) 
 Match of the Year (2003) 
 Most Outstanding Wrestler (1997, 1999)
 Most Underrated Wrestler (1988)
 Tag Team of the Year (1991) 
 Tag Team of the Year (1995) 
 Tag Team of the Year (1996, 1997) 
 Wrestler of the Year (1995, 1997, 1999)
 Wrestling Observer Newsletter Hall of Fame (Class of 1996)

References 

Career achievements of sportspeople
Japanese male professional wrestlers
ja:三沢光晴#タイトル歴